Kanhaiya Lal Teli was a Hindu tailor  who was murdered by two Muslim assailants on 28 June 2022 in Udaipur, in the Indian state of Rajasthan. The assailants captured the attack on camera and circulated the video online.

Lal was killed for sharing a social media post made by Indian politician and Bharatiya Janata Party spokesperson Nupur Sharma, whose comments led to the 2022 Muhammad remarks controversy. The assailants entered Lal's store posing as customers, chatted to him before finally killing him on camera. Videos of the murder were posted on the internet, with two assailants holding butcher knives and claiming responsibility for the murder, identifying themselves as Muhammad Riyaz Attari and Muhammad Ghaus.

Local authorities announced a curfew and blocked internet access after videos of the attack went viral on social media, triggering mass outrage across India. The Indian government made attempts to stop the video of the brutal attack from circulating online.

Background
Kanhaiya Lal Teli (also reported as Kanhaiya Lal Sahu, born ) was a tailor from the Dhanmandi area of Udaipur, the father of two sons who belonged to the Hindu Teli community.

On June 11, Lal's neighbor Nazim had registered a case against him over a controversial social media post, stating support for Nupur Sharma, which led to Lal's arrest. Subsequently, Lal was released on bail. On June 15, Lal had filed a request for protection with the local police after receiving death threats. In his complaint against Nazim and five others at Dhan Mandi police station, Lal stated that he was receiving threats from Nazim and others and alleged that the group had circulated his photo within their community on social media with a message that Lal should be killed if seen anywhere or if he opens his shop. The police said that they had mediated and resolved the matter between Nazim and Lal. Kanhaiya then gave a statement to police that he does not want any further action in the case. Lal said that the controversial post was shared inadvertently by his son while playing a game on his phone, and that Lal did not know how to operate a phone.

Murder
Muhammad Riyaz Attari, one of the two accused, had made a video days before the attack on June 17 where he stated his intent for murder for remarks against the prophet Muhammad, to make a "viral" video and his disregard for further consequences.

On June 28, two assailants entered Lal's tailor shop posing as customers. When Lal began taking the measurements for one of them, he was attacked with cleavers at 2.45 p.m. The entire attack was caught on video by the assailants. After subduing Lal, the two accused dragged him out of the shop and slit his throat with a makeshift dagger made at their welding workshop. Lal was stabbed at different parts of the body. A shop assistant of Lal also sustained severe head injuries trying to save him. Other shopkeepers did not make attempts to rescue him. The assailants fled on foot and then drove away on a motorcycle.

In what seems to be a second video (taken after the attack), they boasted about the murder to avenge the insult to Islam  and also made threats against India's Prime Minister Narendra Modi.

Aftermath
After the incident, the local markets in the area were shut down and the traders demanded arrest of the accused. Protests demanding immediate action were staged in various parts of India.

Local authorities of Udaipur imposed a 24-hour curfew and blocked internet access across the state of Rajasthan. The central government deployed the National Investigation Agency, India's primary counterterrorism unit, to investigate the incident.  The police said that the perpetrators had attempted to behead Kanhaiya during the attack but had failed.

On 6 July, the government announced jobs for Kanhaiya's two sons.

Perpetrators
The assailants were identified as Muhammad Riyaz Attari of Asind in Bhilwara and Ghaus Muhammad, both welders (Ghaus also ran a chit fund and was a broker) who had shifted to Udaipur years back and were residents of the Khanjipeer locality. The two belonged to the Barelvi sect of Sunni Islam and were members of the Dawat-e-Islami, a Barelvi organization based in Karachi, Pakistan and lead by Muhammad Ilyas Attar Qadri. Ghaus Mohammad had attended religious sessions organized by Dawat-e-Islami in Karachi in 2014 and the "Attari" surname of Mohammad Riyaz Attari is carried by followers of Muhammad Ilyas Attar Qadri.

While the Barelvi movement, a subsect of the Hanafis which is the most numerous in India, is seen as a less stringent strand of Islam as compared to the Deobandis, most vigilante beheadings in the region for alleged blasphemers of Islam have been linked to the sect. Such as those of Pakistani Punjab governor Salman Taseer by his bodyguard Malik Mumtaz Qadri recently in 2011 or of Mahashe Rajpal, publisher of Rangila Rasul, by Ilm-ud-din before partition in 1929. This variance between the Deobandis and Barelvis might be linked to juridical differences between the two groups, where the former believes foremost in achieving an Islamic administration in a country before meting out punishment according to sharia while the latter in 'instant justice'. The recent rise in such lynching cases has been attributed to Khadim Hussain Rizvi, follower of Barelvi founder Ahmed Raza Khan Barelvi hence the surname "Rizvi" and leader of the Tehreek-e-Labbaik Pakistan, who popularized the slogan "Gustakh-e-Rasul/Nabi ki ek hi saza, sar tan se juda" against alleged blasphemers.

The assailants were arrested by authorities in the Rajsamand district of Rajasthan on June 28, reportedly while trying to flee.

On 1 July 2022, it was reported that Attari may have been planning to infiltrate the BJP through its loyalists, after photos of Attari attending BJP functions surfaced. In a 2020 post on Facebook, Attari had been described by a local Bharatiya Janata Party and Rashtriya Swayamsevak Sangh leader as a "dedicated worker of the BJP".

Investigations also revealed that Attari was riding a motorbike with a customized number plate carrying the number "2611", in reference to the 26/11 terrorist attacks. During interrogations, the assailants described themselves as "self-radicalized". According to police investigation, the duo planned to initially kill Lal at his home.

Reactions
In response to the murder, nearly 7000 people took out silent protest march in the city of Udaipur.

United Nations spokesperson Stéphane Dujarric called for religious harmony and peace globally in response to Kanhaiya Lal's murder.

The All India Muslim Personal Law Board (AIMPLB) condemned the murder stating, "taking law into your own hands is highly condemnable, regrettable and un-Islamic" and added, "Neither the law nor the Islamic Sharia allow it." Head of Jamiat Ulema-e-Hind, Maulana Mahmood Madani stated, "Udaipur incident is a disgrace to humanity; It is disgrace to humanity & an act of defaming Islam. No matter whosoever is a killer, no one has the authority to take the law and order into his own hands." Religious body Jamaat-e-Islami Hind called the incident "barbaric, Uncivilized and there is no room for Justification of violence in Islam. Peace should not be disturbed. Nobody should try to take advantage of this ugly crime". Shahabuddin Razvi of the Barelvi All India Tanzeem Ulama-e-Islam also condemned the attack, stating "Muslims should not take the law in their own hands, complain to the government, it is the government's job to punish."

Hindu organisations like Vishva Hindu Parishad and Bajrang Dal staged protests and demanded strict action against the culprits. Although the Rashtriya Swayamsevak Sangh remained silent, RSS-linked Muslim Rashtriya Manch demanded capital punishment for the accused.

Amnesty International condemned the incident and urged the Indian government to take action against killers.

See also
 Murder of Umesh Kolhe
 Murder of Kishan Bharvad
 Kamlesh Tiwari
 Murder of Rinku Sharma
 Lynching of Priyantha Kumara
 Murder of Samuel Paty
 Murder of Lee Rigby
 Blasphemy in India
 Internet censorship in India
 Beheading video
 Jyllands-Posten Muhammad cartoons controversy

References

2022 crimes in India
2022 murders in India
2020s in Rajasthan
June 2022 crimes in Asia
June 2022 events in India
Stabbing attacks in 2022
Crime in Rajasthan
Murder in India
Deaths by stabbing in India
Deaths by person in India
Islamism-related beheadings
Islamic terrorism in India
Stabbing attacks in Asia
Religiously motivated violence in India
People killed by Islamic terrorism
People persecuted by Muslims
Persecution of Hindus
People murdered in India
Victims of Islamic terrorism
Violence against Hindus in India
Filmed executions
Filmed killings in Asia
Beheading videos
Dawat-e-Islami
History of Udaipur
Hate crimes in India